Foreign relations exist between Australia and Kazakhstan. Both nations established diplomatic relations on 22 June 1992. Australia is accredited to Kazakhstan from its embassy in Moscow, Russia. Kazakhstan is accredited to Australia from its embassy in Singapore and maintains a consulate-general in Sydney.

Political
Australia is the second country after New Zealand in Oceania to recognize Kazakhstan’s independence in 1991. An Australian embassy was opened in Almaty in 1995, however, it was closed in 1999 due to budget constraints. Kazakhstan's ambassador to Australia is resident in Singapore. In 2015, Kazakhstan opened a consulate-general in Sydney.

A number of high-level visits have taken place between Australia and Kazakhstan. Kazakhstan's former prime minister, Sergey Tereshchenko, visited Australia in 1993. Governor General of Australia, Bill Hayden, visited Kazakhstan in 1994, and Kazakh President Nursultan Nazarbayev visited Australia in 1996. 

In 2010, the Australian Foreign Minister, Kevin Rudd, visited Astana to attend the OSCE Summit held whilst Kazakhstan was chair of the organisation. Foreign Minister Rudd visited Kazakhstan once more in June 2011 for the OIC Foreign Minister's meeting in Astana.

Economy
Kazakhstan is Australia’s leading trading partner in Central Asia. Both countries have signed an agreement on economic and commercial cooperation, which was ratified on 2 June 2004. Trade relations between both nations are modest. Two-way merchandise trade in 2014 was worth A$22million.

See also
 Foreign relations of Australia
 Foreign relations of Kazakhstan

References

 
Kazakhstan
Australia